This is a list of all cricketers who have played first-class or List A cricket for Defence Housing Authority cricket team. The team played ten first-class matches and eleven List A matches between 2003 and 2005. Seasons given are first and last seasons; the player did not necessarily play in all the intervening seasons.

Players
 Aamer Iqbal, 2003/04-2004/05
 Agha Sabir, 2004/05
 Anees Sheikh, 2003/04
 Asif Zakir, 2003/04-2004/05
 Asmatullah Mohmand, 2003/04
 Atif Maqbool, 2004/05-2006/07
 Azam Hussain, 2003/04-2004/05
 Faisal Khan, 2004/05
 Fayyaz Shah, 2003/04-2005/06
 Iftikhar Ali, 2003/04
 Iqbal Imam, 2004/05-2005/06
 Malik Aftab, 2003/04-2006/07
 Mohammad Bilal, 2003/04
 Mohammad Farrukh, 2004/05
 Mohtashim Ali, 2003/04-2004/05
 Mubashir Ahmed, 2003/04-2006/07
 Muzaffar Hussain, 2003/04
 Nasir Khan, 2003/04-2005/06
 Rajesh Ramesh, 2004/05
 Riaz Sheikh, 2004/05
 Rizwan Akbar, 2004/05
 Rizwan Qureshi, 2003/04-2005/06
 Rizwan Saeed, 2003/04-2006/07
 Saqib Zia, 2003/04
 Shakeel-ur-Rehman, 2004/05
 Sharjeel Ashraf, 2003/04
 Umair Hasan, 2003/04
 Wajid Ali, 2003/04-2006/07
 Wasim Naeem, 2003/04-2006/07

References

Defence Housing Authority cricketers